Constrictor is the ninth solo studio album by American rock musician Alice Cooper, released on September 22, 1986 by MCA Records. After a hiatus from the music industry after the release of DaDa (1983), Cooper remained in seclusion for three years. He starred in Monster Dog (1986), a horror film for which he wrote two songs. He also guest starred on the Twisted Sister track "Be Chrool to Your Scuel". Constrictor was Alice Cooper's first studio album to feature Kane Roberts on guitar, Kip Winger, who would later gain fame with his own band, Winger, on bass guitar, and the only one to feature David Rosenberg on drums.

The album returned Cooper to the charts at number 59 after his previous two studio albums Zipper Catches Skin (1982) and DaDa (1983) had failed to crack the Top 200.

The horror series Friday the 13th teamed up with Cooper during this time to produce the theme song for its latest film. The song "He's Back (The Man Behind the Mask)" was written for Friday the 13th Part VI: Jason Lives (1986) and went on to become a #1 hit in Sweden. Also featured in the film were Constrictors "Teenage Frankenstein" and "Hard Rock Summer", the latter of which did not end up on the album.

The track "The Great American Success Story" was apparently intended as the theme song to the Rodney Dangerfield film Back to School (1986), but was not actually used.

The demo of "He's Back (The Man Behind the Mask)" was totally different from the final album version. A reworked version of the "He's Back" demo landed on the album as "Trick Bag" instead. The version of "He's Back" that was featured in Friday the 13th Part VI: Jason Lives was remixed from the album version.

Constrictor also led to one of the most successful tours of the late 1980s, "The Nightmare Returns" tour. Three songs from the album, "Teenage Frankenstein", "Give It Up" and "The World Needs Guts" were regularly performed on this tour. However, as with all Cooper live songs since his third solo studio album Lace and Whiskey (1977), these songs failed to remain in the setlist during subsequent tours. "Teenage Frankenstein" was also played on the tour supporting the follow-up studio album Raise Your Fist and Yell and occasionally during the 2001 "Descent into Dragontown" tour and during the 2019 "Ol' Black Eyes Is Back" tour, whilst "He's Back (The Man Behind the Mask)" was played occasionally in the late 1980s and the early 2000s before becoming a frequent part of the setlist on the "Raise the Dead" tour. The song was resurrected alongside Teenage Frankenstein during the "Ol' Black Eyes Is Back" tour, the song wasn’t played during the American leg and a portion of the European leg.

Track listing

Personnel
Musicians
Alice Cooper – lead vocals
Kane Roberts – guitars, bass, keyboards, drums, backing vocals
Kip Winger – bass, backing vocals
David Rosenberg – drums
Donnie Kisselbach – bass
Paul Delph – keyboards, backing vocals on "He's Back"
Tom Kelly – backing vocals on "He's Back"
Beau Hill – backing vocals

Technical
Beau Hill – production
Michael Wagener – production, mixing
Stephen Benben – engineering
Ira McLaughlin – assistant engineering
Garth Richardson – assistant mixing
Mike Reese – mastering
Anita Bourne – production coordination

Charts

Certifications

References

External links
 

1986 albums
Alice Cooper albums
MCA Records albums
Albums produced by Beau Hill
Glam metal albums